is a Japanese singer, songwriter and voice actress. She also produces an all-female pop group called Afilia Saga. She was born in Tokyo, Japan and is affectionately referred to as Halko by her fans, a nickname she gave herself which is inspired by HAL 9000, the computer in the film 2001: A Space Odyssey.

Biography

Career
Haruko took interest in personal computers from a young age and studied personal computer communications during high school. She was later offered a job as a writer for the magazine.

During the late nineties, Haruko began singing and doing live performances on the streets of Harajuku and Akihabara. She then debuted her single "Mail Me," a cover version of which appears in the movie Suicide Circle in 2001. Soon after, she debuted as a voice actress for her role as Komugi Nakahara in Nurse Witch Komugi. In 2001, she paired with Masaya Koike to form the duo UNDER17 and together performed songs for adult and mainstream video games and anime. After their last album Best Album 3 ~Soshite Densetsu e...~ and a live tour of the same name, UNDER17 separated in 2004 citing creative differences, and the two musicians have since gone their separate ways. She continued on with her solo singing career and in 2006, was signed under avex mode as a music composer and singer.

In 2007, Halko published an autobiography entitled Akihaba-LOVE, in which she tells of the major experiences that shaped her life, mainly those that were important in constructing her career as a musician and voice actress, but it also includes anecdotes from her childhood and stories of friendship, as well as personal opinions on different aspects of anime fandom.

Filmography

Anime
2001
Final Fantasy: Unlimited (Ai Hayakawa)
The SoulTaker (Komugi Nakahara)
2002
Ai Yori Aoshi (Chika Minazuki)
Galaxy Angel A (Announcer)
Gravion (Doria)
UFO Ultramaiden Valkyrie (Maru)
2003
Ai Yori Aoshi:Enishi (Chika Minazuki)
Bottle Fairy (Tama-chan)
Da Capo (Utamaru)
Popotan (Mii)
Mahoromatic: Summer Special (Shi Ho)
Mouse (Samantha Morijima in Ep. 12)
2004
DearS (China)
Gravion Zwei (Doria)
Kujibiki Unbalance (Shinobu Enomoto)
Paranoia Agent (Maromi)
Ragnarok The Animation (Maya)
Ryūsei Sentai Musumet (Kō Saotome)
2005
Da Capo Second Season (Utamaru)
2006
Blackjack 21 (Suzie)
Lovely Idol (Mai Nonomiya)
Magikano (Marin Nijihara)
2007
Code-E (Keiko Komatsuna)
Prism Ark (Filia)
My Bride Is a Mermaid (San Seto)
2008
Mission-E (Keiko Komatsuna)
Tales of the Abyss (Anise Tatlin)
2011
Steins;Gate (Faris NyanNyan)
2014
Wonder Momo (Original Wonder Momo)
2017
Akiba's Trip: The Animation (Momo Tsukumo)
2018
Steins;Gate 0 (Faris NyanNyan)

OVA
Majokko Tsukune-chan (Tsukune)
Netrun-mon (Chiyu)
Nurse Witch Komugi (Komugi Nakahara/Magical Nurse Komugi)
Nurse Witch Komugi-Chan Magikarte Z (Komugi Nakahara/Magical Nurse Komugi)
Moekan (Moe no Mikoto)

Anime Movie
Camp Pikachu (Wynaut)

Tokusatsu
Unofficial Sentai Akibaranger (herself)
Unofficial Sentai Akibaranger Season Two (Yuru-Chara Jigen)

Games
Baldr Force EXE (Baschiera)
BALDR BULLET "REVELLION" (Asou Natsume)
D.C.P.S.: Da Capo Plus Situation (Utamaru)
D.C. Four Seasons: Da Capo Four Seasons (Utamaru)
DearS (China)

Nurse Witch Komugi (Komugi Nakahara/Magical Nurse Komugi)
Prism Ark (Filia)
Prism Ark -AWAKE- (Filia)
Queen's Gate: Spiral Chaos (Wonder Momo)
Steins;Gate (Feiris Nyannyan)
Steins;Gate - Darling of Loving Vows (Feiris Nyannyan)
Steins;Gate - Linear Bounded Phenogram (Feiris Nyannyan)
Steins;Gate 0 (Feiris Nyannyan)
Stella Deus: The Gate of Eternity (Tia)
Tales of the Abyss (Anise Tatlin)
Tales of the World: Radiant Mythology 2 (Anise Tatlin)
Tales of the World: Radiant Mythology 3 (Anise Tatlin)
Tales of Fandom Vol.2 (Anise Tatlin)
Phantasy Star Online 2 (Lottie)

Miscellaneous
Kawaii! JeNny (Sister B)

Radio

Kageyama ☆ Momoi no Baisoku Moe-Chan Neru
Popo-Radi (Ended)
Ragnarok Online: THE RADIO (Ended)
Ura Momoi (Ended)
Prism Knight (Ended)
TOKYO→NIIGATA MUSIC CONVOY (January, 2006)
Momoi Haruko no Chō! Momoi
Momoi Haruko no Radio ☆ UP DATE (Ended)
avex presents Momoi Haruko no NikoNiko RADIO
avex presents Momoi Haruko no FumuFumu RADIO
My Bride Is a Mermaid: Yomeiri Radio (Ended)

Drama CD
Ai Yori Aoshi series (Chika Minazuki)

Tales of the Abyss series (Anise Tatlin)
Prism Ark Special Sound Package (Filia)
Prism Ark Drama CD: Sister Hell Prism Variation (Filia)
Ragnarok The Animation Ver.1-Ver.3 (Maya)

Poporaji (Mii)

Television
D's Garage21 (TV Asahi, ended)
Anime TV (Guest)
AniPara Music-place (Guest)
Geki☆Ten (Guest)
Akiba!AKIBA☆Akiba (Guest)
Anime Tengoku (Guest, regular from October 2007)
HOT WAVE (TV Saitama, guest)
JoyPopTune (TV Saitama)

@Tunes. (tvk, guest)

Discography

Singles

Albums

Anime Singles

DVD
momo-i Live DVD (avex mode)
Haruko☆UP DATE (Pony Canyon)
CLIP BEST (avex mode)
Simultaneous release with the album Sunday early morning on March 5, 2008 with the making-of of her PVs and image collection.

Book
Akihaba LOVE ~Akihabara to issho ni otona ni natta~

Convention appearances

Momoi has appeared in various convention concerts outside Japan.  To date, she has visited the United States, Germany, Canada, Mexico, Finland, United Kingdom and Russia.
Anime Expo 2007, Long Beach, California: June 29 - July 2, 2007
Connichi 2007, Kassel, Germany: September 7–9, 2007
Anime North 2008, Toronto, Ontario, Canada: May 23–25, 2008
Connichi 2008, Kassel, Germany: September 12–14, 2008
FanimeCon 2009, San Jose, California: May 22–25, 2009
Aya Revolution 2009, Coventry, United Kingdom: August 14–16, 2009
Anime Vegas 2009, Las Vegas, Nevada: September 5–7, 2009
FanimeCon 2010, San Jose, California: May 28–31, 2010
Desucon 2010, Lahti, Finland: June 12–13, 2010
Momo-i Night Fest 2010, Las Vegas, Nevada: June 19, 2010
J-popcon 2010, Copenhagen, Denmark: November 13, 2010
FanimeCon 2011, San Jose, California: May 27–30, 2011
Japan Expo 2011, Paris, France: June 30-July 3, 2011
Otakuthon 2011, Montreal, Quebec, Canada: August 12-August 14, 2011
JapanDay 2011, Düsseldorf, Germany: October 15-October 16, 2011
J-Fest 2011, Moscow, Russia: November 19-November 20, 2011
Anime Boston 2012, Boston, Massachusetts: April 6–8, 2012
SMASH! Sydney Manga and Anime Show 2013, Sydney, Australia: August 10, 2013
Idol Matsuri 2014, Silverdale, Washington: June 20–22, 2014

References

External links

 
Official blog 

J!-ENT Special Feature Article & Interview: Momoi Halko (2007) 25-page J!-ENT Special Feature
A public statement from Momoi Halko to her American fans J!-ENT - July 2007
Exclusive Momoi Halko Interview at FanimeCon 2009 The-O Network Online
Interview With Haruko Momoi at Anime Boston 2012 Anime Herald

1977 births
Living people
Anime singers
Japanese women singer-songwriters
Japanese radio personalities
Japanese video game actresses
Japanese voice actresses
Singers from Tokyo
Video game musicians
Voice actresses from Tokyo
21st-century Japanese actresses
20th-century Japanese women singers
20th-century Japanese singers
21st-century Japanese women singers
21st-century Japanese singers